Sir Edward Manningham-Buller, 1st Baronet (19 July 1800 – 22 September 1882), born Edward Buller-Yarde-Buller, was a politician in the United Kingdom. He was member of parliament (MP) for North Staffordshire from 1833 to 1841, for Stafford from 1841 to 1847, and for North Staffordshire again from 1865 to 1874.

He was made a Baronet on 20 January 1866, of Dilhorne, in the County of Stafford, and, in the same year, legally changed his name to Edward Manningham-Buller by Royal License.

References

External links 

1800 births
1882 deaths
Manningham-Buller, Sir Edward, 1st Baronet
Members of the Parliament of the United Kingdom for Stafford
UK MPs 1832–1835
UK MPs 1835–1837
UK MPs 1837–1841
UK MPs 1841–1847
UK MPs 1865–1868
UK MPs 1868–1874
Younger sons of baronets
Edward